Dmitry Maksimov may refer to:
Dmitry Maksimov (runner) (born 1977), Russian long-distance runner
Dmitry Maksimov (judoka) (born 1978), Russian judoka